Halifax was a provincial electoral district in Nova Scotia, Canada, that elected three, and then five members to the Nova Scotia House of Assembly. It existed from 1867 to 1933, at which point Halifax County was divided into five separate electoral districts: Halifax South, Halifax Centre, Halifax North, Halifax East and Halifax West.

Members of the Legislative Assembly 
From 1867 to 1916, Halifax elected three members to the Legislative Assembly. From 1916 to 1933, it elected five members.

Halifax County elected the following members to the Legislative Assembly.

Election results

1867 general election

1871 general election

1874 general election

1878 general election

1882 general election

1886 general election

1890 general election

1894 general election

1897 general election

1901 general election

1906 general election

1911 general election

1916 general election

1920 general election

1925 general election

1928 general election

References

Former provincial electoral districts of Nova Scotia